Scrobipalpa kurokoi is a moth in the family Gelechiidae. It was described by Povolný in 1977. It is found in Japan and the Russian Far East (Sakhalin).

References

Scrobipalpa
Moths described in 1977
Taxa named by Dalibor Povolný